Bartkowiak is a 2021 Polish film directed by Daniel Markowicz, written by Australian screenwriter Daniel Bernardi and starring Szymon Bobrowski, Janusz Chabior and Zofia Domalik.

Cast 
 Szymon Bobrowski		
 Janusz Chabior
 Zofia Domalik	
 Jan Frycz	
 Joanna Kocyla	
 Cezary Lukaszewicz	
 Damian Majewski
 Margo Marlow as VIP Guest
 Antoni Pawlicki
 Józef Pawlowski as Tomek Bartkowiak
 Danuta Stenka	
 Bartlomiej Topa
 Rafal Zawierucha as Steppy D

References

External links
 
 

2021 films
Polish-language Netflix original films
2020s Polish-language films